Marco Roberto Borsato (born 21 December 1966) is a  Dutch singer. Born in Alkmaar, North Holland, he started performing in Italian before switching to Dutch in 1994. He has consistently been one of the most successful and biggest grossing artists in the Netherlands and Belgium for the past thirty years.

Borsato achieved 15 number-one singles in the Netherlands, the second-most all time behind The Beatles' 16. In 1994, his song "Dromen Zijn Bedrog" spent a then-record 12 weeks at number one, a feat which stood for 17 years. It still remains the longest-running Dutch language number-one song ever. Between 2003 and 2008, Borsato became the first artist to record nine consecutive number-one singles on the Dutch charts.

Borsato also has recorded 11 number-one albums in the Netherlands, all certified at least Platinum, with every eligible studio album of his from 1995 to 2013 debuting at number one on the Dutch album charts. Borsato also has six number-one albums in Belgium.

Despite his long run of commercial success, his music was removed from all Dutch public radio stations' playlists in 2022 after sexual assault allegations relating to The Voice of Holland scandal.

Early life
Marco Roberto Borsato was born in the Wilhelmina Hospital in Alkmaar as the son of Roberto Borsato and Mary de Graaf. He has a brother, Armando, and a sister, Sylvana. His father is Italian and the family moved to Italy, where the father started a restaurant in Garda. Borsato spent a significant amount of time in Italy and speaks fluent Italian.

When Borsato was twelve years old, he decided he wanted to be a sushi chef. Borsato, though brought up with Italian cuisine, felt a great love for this cuisine. When he was older, he went to school during the week and worked in a restaurant during the weekends. During his conscription, he was bound to the cavalry, where he was conscripted as a NCO.

Career 
Borsato's career as a musician debuted in 1990, when he won the Dutch talent show Soundmixshow hosted by Henny Huisman with his rendition of Billy Vera's "At This Moment." At the time, he was still working as a chef. The accomplishment allowed him to sign a record deal, where he released three albums sung in the Italian language: Emozioni, Sento and Giorno per giorno.

Borsato earned newfound popularity in 1994, when he began to sing songs in Dutch, as recommended by his songwriting partner John Ewbank. His first Dutch-language single "Dromen Zijn Bedrog" ("Dreams Are Deceptive”) reached number one in the Netherlands and stayed there for 12 weeks, selling over 240,000 copies. It broke the record for longest time spent at number one on the Dutch chart. Borsato held the record until 2011, when "Balada" by Gusttavo Lima spent 13 weeks at number one. His second single "Waarom Nou Jij" also reached number one on the Dutch Top 40.

His fifth album Als geen ander, released in 1995, was certified 4× Platinum and became his first number-one album in the Netherlands. It produced four singles, three of which reached the top ten in the Netherlands. In 1997, Borsato released De waarheid, which also debuted at number one in the Netherlands and stayed there for seven weeks. It would be certified 6× Platinum. His seventh album De bestemming followed shortly after in 1998, debuting at number one in the Netherlands and staying there for four weeks. It is certified 5× Platinum. The album's title track became his third number one single on the Dutch Top 40. "Binnen", the lead single to Borsato's eighth album Luid en duidelijk, reached number one in 1999, and the album came out in early 2000, to another number-one debut and eight weeks atop the albums chart. It is certified 5× Platinum. "Lopen op het water", the lead single to Borsato's greatest hits album Onderweg, became his fifth number-one single in 2001.

Beginning in 2003, with "Afscheid nemen bestaat niet" and ending in 2008 with "Dochters", Borsato recorded nine consecutive number-one singles on the Dutch singles charts, an accomplishment which remains unmatched to this day.

Borsato's ninth album Zien was released in 2004 on DVD only and was certified 4× Platinum. It produced three number-one singles, including "Wat zou je doen?" featuring Dutch rapper Ali B. In 2006, Borsato released a live album, Symphonica in Rosso, which also saw all three of its singles reach number one in the Netherlands. This included a cover of "Because We Believe" featuring Andrea Bocelli and "Every Time I Think of You" featuring British singer-songwriter Lucie Silvas. The album debuted at number one in the Netherlands and stayed at its peak for one week, being certified 5× Platinum.

His tenth album Wit licht came out in 2008 and debuted at number one in the Netherlands, remaining there for six non-consecutive weeks. All three of its singles, the title track, "Stop de tijd" and "Dochters", reached number one, giving Borsato 14 career number-one singles and nine consecutive.

In 2009, Borsato was dealt a financial blow when his company The Entertainment Group, a major events organiser and Dutch artists representer, was declared bankrupt by a Dutch court.

Borsato's eleventh album Dromen durven delen was released in 2010 to another number-one debut and five weeks on top. However, its lead single "Schouder aan schouder" with Guus Meeuwis only peaked at No. 2, and its follow-ups at No. 9, No. 11, No. 29 and No. 29. Duizend spiegels in 2013 also debuted at number one on the Dutch albums chart and produced two top-ten singles. However, his thirteenth studio album Evenwicht in 2015 peaked at No. 2 behind Adele's 25, the first time since Marco in 1994 that a Borsato studio album did not debut at number one in the Netherlands.

In 2019, Borsato released the single "Hoe het Danst" with Dutch DJ Armin van Buuren and singer Davina Michelle. It became his first number-one song in 11 years and the fifteenth number-one single on the Dutch Top 40 in his career. It was also the 21st single of his to reach the top three in the Netherlands, extending his record over the Beatles' 19 for the most in chart history.

Borsato scored the 40th top 40 hit of his career with "Lippenstift" in 2019, making him the seventh musical act to accomplish so.

Other functions
Borsato was an ambassador of the Dutch NGO War Child, which helps children in post-conflict areas to cope with their war experiences.

In 2011, he became a judge on the Dutch talent show The Voice of Holland and The Voice Kids. He is currently the third highest-times winning coach in any The Voice version throughout the world, with four winners in The Voice of Holland and three winners in The Voice Kids.

Personal life 
Borsato married Dutch TV personality Leontine Ruiters in 1998. They have three children together: Luca (b. 1998), Senna (b. 2001), and Jada (b. 2002). In February 2020, the couple announced their divorce after 22 years of marriage.

In 2019, it was revealed that Borsato had an extramarital affair with Dutch pianist Iris Hond in 2009. In a 2021 interview with television presenter Linda de Mol, Borsato said that he frequently cheated on Ruiters because of an "intimacy vacuum" in their relationship.

Borsato and fellow judge Ali B were rumored to have had sex with his The Voice contestant Maan de Steenwinkel. After Borsato was accused of sexually assaulting underage The Voice Kids contestants, Maan denied being pressured into having sex with her judge Borsato.

Before being accused of serial sexual assault, Borsato earned a reputation as "the ideal son-in-law" because of his smaller stature and history of kind behavior to employees and fans.

Sexual assault allegations 
On 13 December 2021, a 22-year-old Dutch woman filed charges against Borsato with the police, accusing Borsato of grooming and sexually assaulting her for years beginning when she was 15 by touching her genitals, buttocks and breasts against her will. The victim considered Borsato, who was a family friend, to be a father figure after her own father died. In the following days, two more women accused Borsato of sexual abuse.

On 20 January 2022, a report by Dutch online investigative show BOOS accused Borsato of inappropriately touching six contestants, three of whom were underage, while he was a judge on The Voice Kids. The victims included girls aged 13 and 14. In one of the alleged incidents, Borsato groped a 14-year-old girl's buttocks during a professional barbecue he held for The Voice Kids. The three underage victims claimed that Borsato "mainly touched their buttocks unsolicited and for a long time in work spheres."

As a result of the allegations, Borsato's music was banned from the playlists of radio stations operated by NPO, Talpa and Qmusic. His wax figure at the Madame Tussauds Amsterdam museum was also removed. In may 2023 the Dutch prosecution announced that there is no evidence for the allogations. Despite being canceled and his trial by media, Borsato is innocent.

Awards and honours

Honours
 2004: Officer of the Order of Orange-Nassau, for services to Dutch music and his dedication to War Child Netherlands

Awards
 1996 – 2006: Won a TMF Award, eleven times for best Dutch singer (In 2006, he joined Anouk in announcing their withdrawal from future TMF Awards-nominations. "Every year the same faces can get boring".)
 1997: Edison Award, two times (Best Singer, Best Single of the Year)
 1999: Golden Harp (with John Ewbank)
 2000: Hitkrant Award, for the song Binnen ("Inside")
 2000: Honorary Award for Best Album (Luid en Duidelijk ("Loud and Clear")) and Best Singer
 2001: Edison Award (Best Singer)
 2010: Twitteraar van het Jaar (Best Twitter user)

Discography

 Emozioni (1990)
 Sento (1991)
 Giorno per giorno (1992)
 Marco (1994)
 Als geen ander (1995)
 De waarheid (1997)
 De bestemming (1998)
 Luid en duidelijk (2000)
 Onderweg (2002)
 Zien (2004)
 Symphonica in Rosso - Live CD (2006)
 Wit licht (2008)
 Dromen durven delen (2010)
 Duizend spiegels (2013)
 Evenwicht (2015)
 Thuis (2017)

References

External links

 
 

1966 births
Living people
Dutch male singers
Dutch people of Italian descent
Dutch pop singers
Officers of the Order of Orange-Nassau
People from Alkmaar